Patrick Farrell (3 April 1872 – 1950), commonly known as Pat or Paddy Farrell, was an Ireland international footballer. He played as a right half in the Football League for Woolwich Arsenal, in the Irish League for Ligoniel, Belfast Celtic and Distillery, in the Scottish Cup for Celtic, and in the English Southern League for Brighton United and Brighton & Hove Albion. He won two Irish League titles with Distillery, in 1895–96 and 1900–01.

References

1872 births
1950 deaths
Association footballers from Belfast
Irish association footballers (before 1923)
Pre-1950 IFA international footballers
Association football wing halves
Ligoniel F.C. players
Belfast Celtic F.C. players
Lisburn Distillery F.C. players
Celtic F.C. players
Arsenal F.C. players
Brighton United F.C. players
Brighton & Hove Albion F.C. players
NIFL Premiership players
English Football League players
Southern Football League players